The 1981–82 Elitserien season was the seventh season of the Elitserien, the top level of ice hockey in Sweden. 10 teams participated in the league, and AIK won the championship.

Standings

Playoffs

External links
 Swedish Hockey League official site
1982 Swedish national championship finals at SVT's open archive 

Swedish Hockey League seasons
1981–82 in Swedish ice hockey
Swedish